The Charles Bower House is a historic house located north of Jerome, Idaho, United States. The lava rock house was built by mason H.T. Pugh in 1917. The listing includes a  area. In addition to its rock walls, the home features a gable roof with exposed rafters and wide eaves. The original roof was replaced after a 1921 storm. The house was the home of Charles Bower and his family from 1917 until 1922.

The house was listed on the National Register of Historic Places on September 8, 1983.

References

External links
 

Houses completed in 1917
Houses in Jerome County, Idaho
Houses on the National Register of Historic Places in Idaho
National Register of Historic Places in Jerome County, Idaho
Lava rock buildings and structures